The Connecticut Network, also known as CT-N, is a 24-hour Cable TV Government-access television (GATV) channel that provides coverage of Connecticut state government and public affairs founded by Thomas Harold, a news reporter for WFSB. In 1999 on September 1, On replacing Connecticut Government Channel (launched in 1980, Connecticut Network was inaugurated at 7:05 am as a 24-hour government access to all the people and politicians in time for the State-to-State Address by the Governor of Connecticut. On September 2, the longest running program, The Capitol Report aired on CTN for the first time. The longest running slot is on Thursdays since the program's launch.

History 
On September 29, 1980, Charles Harold (1925-2009) launched the Connecticut Government Channel (CTGC) at noon, Eastern Standard Time, when in 1976, Harold ended his career at WTIC (now WFSB in 1974) as a news reporter since 1961 after almost 15 years. At age 13, he began his career working as a newspaper boy for selling local newspapers in Boston until 1951, he got his first news reporting job at WGBH Radio, then at WBZ-TV in 1953. Then when he moved to Hartford Connecticut and then he was hired still as a news reporter in 1955 at WNHC (now WTNH in 1971). Then until 1961 he was hired still as a news reporter at WTIC-TV (channel 3) and stayed there for almost 15 years, reporting from Hartford to New Haven and Derby. He decided to quit and start a 24 hour cable news and government network starting the concept in 1977 then it was launched in 1980.

Schedule for the day of Opening (September 29, 1980)

CTGC Inaugrational Launch (12:00pm to 1:00pm)

State-to-State Address by the Governor of Connecticut (1:00pm to 3:30pm)

CTGC News Sunday with Charles Harold (3:30pm to 4:00pm)

In the State Capitol Today (4:00pm to 6:00pm)

Evans and Novak (6:00pm to 7:00pm)

CTGC Sunday Night (7:00pm–8:00pm)

In the State Capitol tonight (8:00pm to midnight)

As the Connecticut Network
On August 31, 1999 the CTGC stopped on the air at 11:59pm and then on September 1, 1999 at midnight, the Connecticut Network (CT-N) was launched and the next day the Capitol Report went on air, only on Tuesdays. Today they still air government and news access program as they changed their look in 2017.

Programs on The Day of opening (September 1, 1999)

CT-N Inaugrational Launch (midnight to 4pm)

Business Day (4:00pm to 5:00pm)

CT-N Daybreak (5:00pm to 8am)

State Capitol Affairs (8am to 6pm)

CT-N Weeknight News (6pm -7pm)

State Capitol Affairs Tonight (7pm-12am)

References

Television stations in Connecticut
Commercial-free television networks
Television networks in the United States
Legislature broadcasters in the United States
Connecticut General Assembly
24-hour television news channels in the United States
Television channels and stations established in 1999
1999 establishments in Connecticut